East Richmond railway station may refer to:

East Richmond railway station, Melbourne, in Victoria, Australia
East Richmond railway station, Sydney, in New South Wales, Australia